The Church of San Pietro Apostolo is a church dedicated to St. Peter the Apostle in San Pietro Vernotico, in Apulia, Italy. The first settlements of the town were recorded around this church, between the VIII and the IX century A.D.

History 
The present Church of San Pietro Apostolo dates back to the 16th century. In ancient times, however, it was inhabited by Basilian monks (330-379 AD). Indeed, it was rebuilt on a previous medieval building. From a document dated 1133, it’s believed  that the Church dates back to around the year 1000, when the Basilian Fathers built a small church dedicated to the Apostle Peter in the hamlet of Venocio because, according to the legend, the Saint would have spent the winter in the village. Traces of the previous construction of simple quadrangular plan with a vaulted ceiling are located in the ancient room now used as a sacristy. Next to the church there was a place that for centuries was called "oratory of the pilgrims": a set of rooms, or huts, used to host pilgrims who came from distant countries for devotion to St. Peter.

By popular legend, on the left side of the Church, there was once a well with miraculous water, which was used to heal the wounds of tarantula bites. The well was closed in the early 1900s.

Description 
Around the original building of the church, therefore, was built the Baroque one. The church is laid out in a Latin cross style, between the nave and the transept rises the dome on an octagonal drum, externally decorated with polychrome majolica.

In 1787 the facade of the building was subjected to a deep renovation, as evidenced by the epigraph still visible on the portal of the church: D.O.M. AEDAM HANC DIVO PETRO SACRAM CLERUS VERNOTICENSIS A SCIPIONE SPINA LYCENSIUM PONTIFICI SIBI PATRONATUS JURE LEGATAM, POSTICA ACCESSIONE THOLO, AC MARMORATO EX COLLOATA PIORUM STIPE, AMPLIOREM ELEGANTIOREMQUE F.C.ANNO DOMINI 1787. While the bell gable is dated 1936.

The interior has three altars: the main one is dedicated to the titular of the church and surmounted by a painting of Peter the Apostle and Jesus; the other altars are dedicated, one to St. Paul and the other one to Our Lady of Loreto. In the part of the dome there are four frescoes of the Evangelists. On the walls of the only nave there are some paintings of valuable workmanship and baroque stuccoes of notable historical and artistic interest that represent some episodes of the life of Saint Peter the Apostle.

In the church are preserved the statues of the following saints: San Luigi Gonzaga, San Biagio Vescovo, Santa Rita da Cascia, a statue of the Blessed Virgin of Pompei and another of the Vergine Addolorata.

References 

Christian monasteries in Italy
Byzantine Italy
9th-century churches in Italy
Buildings and structures in Brindisi
Byzantine church buildings

9th-century establishments in Italy
9th-century establishments in the Byzantine Empire
4th-century churches
4th-century establishments in Italy
4th-century establishments in the Roman Empire
16th-century establishments in Italy
16th-century establishments in the Spanish Empire
16th-century Roman Catholic church buildings in Italy